The 2005 SEC men's basketball tournament took place from March 10–13, 2005 in Atlanta, Georgia at the Georgia Dome. The SEC Championship Game was televised by CBS.

The top two teams in both the Eastern and Western Divisions receive byes in the first round, which were Kentucky, Alabama, LSU, and Florida and played their second-round games on March 11, 2005. The winner of the tournament, Florida, received the SEC's automatic bid to the NCAA Tournament.  This was Florida's first SEC tournament championship.

Bracket

Asterisk denotes game ended in overtime.

References

SEC men's basketball tournament
-
March 2005 sports events in the United States
2005 in sports in Georgia (U.S. state)
2005 in Atlanta
College sports in Georgia (U.S. state)
Basketball in Georgia (U.S. state)